Uwe Stickert (born in Sonneberg, East Germany) is a German opera singer (tenor). After his education at the Musik-Gymnasium Belvedere and the Hochschule für Musik Franz Liszt, Weimar, he started with lyric tenor repertory such as Tamino in The Magic Flute and Belmont in Die Entführung aus dem Serail at the Theater Heidelberg and the Nationaltheater Weimar.

Career
Since 2008 he has sung many roles by Mozart such as Tito in La clemenza di Tito, Don Ottavio in Don Giovanni and Ferrando in Così fan tutte, but has widened his range to the French grand opera. He was mentioned by Opernwelt as Singer of the Year for his Raoul de Nangis in Meyerbeer's Les Huguenots in 2014. He has appeared as Arnold in Guillaume Tell and as Leopold in La Juive by Halévy. He made his debut at Opéra de Nice as Raoul in Les Huguenots in 2016

Prizes 
 2008: Debut 3rd prize

Recordings 
 Anna-Amalia von Sachsen-Weimar, Erwin und Elmire, Deutsche Schallplatten, 2007
 Franz Liszt, Works for Violin, Piano and Voice, Hänssler, 2011
 Böhmische Weihnacht, Werke u.a. von Vejvanowsky mit Ludwig Güttler, Edel Classics, 2014

References

External links 
 

1976 births
Living people
People from Sonneberg
People from Bezirk Suhl
German operatic tenors
21st-century German male  opera singers